Lerado is an unincorporated community in Reno County, Kansas, United States.  Early residents intended to name the community for Laredo, Texas, but a clerical error by the post office resulted in the E and A being swapped.

History
Lerado had a post office from 1874 until 1904, but the post office was called Netherland until 1884.

Education
The community is served by Fairfield USD 310 public school district.

References

Further reading

External links
 Reno County maps: Current, Historic, KDOT

Unincorporated communities in Reno County, Kansas
Unincorporated communities in Kansas
1874 establishments in Kansas
Populated places established in 1874